The year of 2019 included professional tournaments surrounding table-top cue sports. These events include snooker, pool disciplines and billiards. Whilst these are traditionally singles sports, some matches and tournaments are held as doubles, or team events. The snooker season runs between May and April, whilst the pool and billiards seasons run in the calendar year.

Four men's adult world championships were held in 2019, with Judd Trump winning the World Snooker Championship, Ko Ping-chung winning the WPA World Ten-ball Championship, nine-ball by Fedor Gorst and the World Billiards Championship by Peter Gilchrist respectively. Women's world championships featured a World Snooker Championship won by Reanne Evans and the World Billiards Championship won by Anna Lynch. The events in this list are professional, pro–am, or notable amateur cue sports tournaments from the year of 2019.

Pool
The cue sport pool encapsulates several disciplines, such as straight pool and nine-ball. Ko Ping-chung won the WPA World Ten-ball Championship, whilst the World Cup of Pool was won by Austria. In events where there was more than one competition, (m) refers to men, (f) to women, and (w) to a wheelchair competition.

Euro Tour

The Euro Tour is a professional nine-ball series run across Europe by the European Pocket Billiard Federation. The season featured six events, with five women's tournaments.

Women's pool

Southeast Asian Games

English billiards
The 2018–2019 English billiards season started at the end of August 2018. David Causier won the World Matchplay Championship, defeating Peter Gilchrist in the final 8–7.  The 2019–2020 season started in September 2019, with Peter Gilchrist and Anna Lynch winning the World Billiards Championship titles in October 2019.

Southeast Asian Games

Snooker

The World Snooker season begins in July, and ends in May. Judd Trump won his first World Snooker Championship, defeating four-time champion John Higgins in the final. Reanne Evans won the women's world championship, defeating Nutcharut Wongharuthai in the final 6–3.

World ranking events

Challenge Tour

The Challenge Tour was a secondary non-professional snooker tour with events for invited players.

Non-ranking events

Pro–am events
Two events in 2019 were denoted as pro–am, with the events open to specific professional and local amateur players.

Team event

Variant events

World Seniors Tour

The World Seniors Tour is an amateur series open to players aged 40 and over. There were four events in the 2019 World Seniors Tour.

Women's snooker

Amateur snooker championships

References

External links
 World Pool Association Official Website
 World Billiards Official Website
 World Snooker Official Website

 
Cue sports by year
2019 sport-related lists